"The Hustle" is a disco song by songwriter/arranger Van McCoy and the Soul City Symphony. It went to No. 1 on the U.S. Billboard Hot 100 and Hot Soul Singles charts during the summer of 1975. It also peaked at No. 1 on the Canadian RPM charts, No. 9 on the Australian Singles Chart (Kent Music Report) and No. 3 in the UK. It would eventually sell over one million copies. The song won the Grammy Award for Best Pop Instrumental Performance early in 1976 for songs recorded in 1975.

History
While in New York City to make an album, McCoy composed the song after his music partner, Charles Kipps, watched patrons do a dance known as "the Hustle" in the nightclub Adam's Apple. The sessions were done at New York's Mediasound studio with pianist McCoy, bassist Gordon Edwards, drummer Steve Gadd, keyboardist Richard Tee, guitarists Eric Gale and John Tropea, and orchestra leader Gene Orloff. Producer Hugo Peretti contracted multi-woodwind player Phil Bodner to play the piccolo lead melody.

During the summer of 1975, "The Hustle" became a No. 1 hit on the Billboard Hot 100 and Hot Soul Singles charts. Billboard ranked it as the No. 21 song for 1975. It also peaked at No. 9 on the Australian Singles Chart (Kent Music Report) and No. 3 in the UK Singles Chart.

According to producers Hugo & Luigi who owned the Avco record label that originally released "The Hustle", McCoy met with them shortly before his death in 1979 to discuss ideas for a new, longer version of the song, in order to appease Avco's UK and German affiliates who were clamoring for a 12" disco single release. The new version, clocking in at just under six and a half minutes, was assembled posthumously as a remix, using parts of the original recording plus new parts, including drum, Syndrum, and a "little" Moog synthesizer. It was credited to Van McCoy alone or with an unnamed orchestra, mixed by "The Mix Masters", identity unknown.

Appearances in other media 
The song has been featured in numerous movies and television shows including Vampires Suck, the Shark Tale short film Club Oscar, The Lorax, That '70s Show, American Dad!, and Futurama.

Chart performance

Weekly charts

Year-end charts

Certifications and sales

Other versions
Italian rapper Talko made a rap cover of "The Hustle". It was released in 1983 on Babalu Records.
Filipino comedienne Rufa Mae Quinto covered this song as Booba (Do The Hustle) which served as the theme song of the 2001 film Booba. Her version was included in her album Rated R under Viva Records.

References

External links
 

1975 singles
Disco songs
Pop instrumentals
1970s instrumentals
Billboard Hot 100 number-one singles
Cashbox number-one singles
RPM Top Singles number-one singles
Songs written by Van McCoy
1975 songs
Avco Records singles
Song recordings produced by Hugo & Luigi
Songs about dancing
Van McCoy songs